"Valuable Pain" is a song by American rapper YoungBoy Never Broke Again, released on December 10, 2018 as the lead single from his mixtape Realer (2018). It was produced by DrellOnTheTrack and CashFlowBeatz.

Composition
In the song, NBA YoungBoy details the troubles he has had in his relationship, over "soulful", piano-driven production.

Critical reception
Aron A. of HotNewHipHop gave the song a "VERY HOTTTTT" rating and wrote, "On 'Valuable Pain,' Youngboy perfectly balances his melodies and his bars. It's a promising single from Youngboy."

Charts

Certifications

References

2018 singles
2018 songs
YoungBoy Never Broke Again songs
Songs written by YoungBoy Never Broke Again
Atlantic Records singles